Sparks is a ghost town in Nicholas County, in the U.S. state of West Virginia.

History
A post office called Sparks was established in 1907, and remained in operation until 1959. The community was named after Joseph Sparks, a local merchant.

References

Ghost towns in West Virginia
Landforms of Nicholas County, West Virginia